The United Nations Educational, Scientific and Cultural Organization (UNESCO) World Heritage Sites are places of importance to cultural or natural heritage as described in the UNESCO World Heritage Convention, established in 1975 Ethiopia ratified the convention as one of the first countries on July 6, 1977, making its historical sites eligible for inclusion on the list.

Sites in Ethiopia were first inscribed on the list at the 2nd Session of the World Heritage Committee, held in Washington, D.C. in 1978. At that session, two sites were added: the Rock-Hewn Churches, Lalibela and Simien National Park. As of August 2021, Ethiopia has nine total sites inscribed on the list. Of these, one site, Simien National Park, is of natural type, and the others are cultural sites.

World Heritage Sites
The table lists information about each World Heritage Site:
Name: as listed by the World Heritage Committee
Location: city and region of site
Area: size of property and buffer zone
UNESCO data: the site's reference number; the year the site was inscribed on the World Heritage List; the criteria it was listed under: criteria i through vi are cultural, while vii through x are natural; (the column sorts by year added to the list)
Description: brief description of the site

Tentative list
In addition to sites inscribed on the World Heritage List, member states can maintain a list of tentative sites that they may consider for nomination. Nominations for the World Heritage List are only accepted if the site was previously listed on the tentative list. As of 2021, Ethiopia recorded seven sites on its tentative list. The sites, along with the year they were included on the tentative list are:

Bale Mountains National Park (2008)
Dirre Sheik Hussein Religious, Cultural and Historical Site (2011)
Holqa Sof Omar: Natural and Cultural Heritage (Sof Omar: Caves of Mystery) (2011)
Sacred Landscapes of Tigray (2018)
Melka Kunture and Bachilt Archaeological Site (2020)
Gedeo Cultural Landscape (2020)
Cultural Heritage of Yeha (2020)

References

 
Ethiopia
World Heritage Sites